Barry Nash (born 31 December 1996) is an Irish hurler who plays as a left corner-back for the Limerick senior team.

Playing career

South Liberties

Nash joined th South Liberties club at a young age and played in all grades at juvenile and underage levels before joining the club's senior team.

Limerick

Minor and under-21

Nash first played for Limerick as a member of the county's minor team. On 23 July 2013, he scored three points from play when Limerick won their first Munster Championship title in 29 years after a 1-20 to 4-08 defeat of Waterford in a replay of the final.

Nash was eligible for the minor team again in 2014 and won a second successive Munster Championship medal after a 0-24 to 0-18 second successive defeat of Waterford in a replay of the final. On 7 September 2014, Nash scored two points in Limerick's 2-17 to 0-19 All-Ireland final defeat by Kilkenny.

On 30 July 2015, Nash won a Munster Championship medal with the Limerick under-21 team after a 0-22 to 0-19 win over Clare in the final. On 12 September 2015, he was named man of the match when Limerick defeated Wexford by 0-26 to 1-07 in the All-Ireland final.

After surrendering their title in 2016, Nash won a second Munster Championship medal the following year after a 0-16 to 1-11 defeat of Cork in the final. On 9 September 2017, Nash was at left corner-forward in Limerick's 0-17 to 0-11 defeat of Kilkenny in the All-Ireland final.

Senior

Nash was drafted onto the Limerick senior hurling team in January 2016. He made his first appearance for the team in a 2-23 to 0-15 defeat of Wexford in the National Hurling League on 13 February 2016. Later that season, Nash made his first Munster Championship appearance in a 3-12 to 1-16 defeat by Tipperary.

On 6 February 2017, it was announced that Nash had withdrawn from the Limerick senior hurling panel for "personal reasons". Team manager John Kiely stated: "It is what it is. I have no doubt Barry will have a major part to play in the years ahead, who knows, maybe even at some point later this year, he may find himself in a position to return to training." Just over a month after leaving the panel, Nash returned to training.

On 19 August 2018, Nash was a non-playing substitute when Limerick won their first All-Ireland title in 45 years after a 3-16 to 2-18 defeat of Galway in the final.

On 31 March 2019, Nash was named on the bench for Limerick's National League final meeting with Waterford at Croke Park. He collected a winners' medal as a non-playing substitute in the 1-24 to 0-19 victory. On 30 June 2019, Nash won a Munster Championship medal after coming on as a 70th-minute substitute for Declan Hannon in Limerick's 2-26 to 2-14 defeat of Tipperary in the final.

On 25 October 2020, Nash won a second successive National League medal after Limerick's 0-36 to 1-23 win over Clare in the delayed final. Later that season he claimed a second successive Munster Championship medal after lining out at left corner-back in the 0-25 to 0-21 Munster final defeat of Waterford.

Career statistics

Honours

Limerick
 All-Ireland Senior Hurling Championship (4): 2018, 2020, 2021, 2022
Munster Senior Hurling Championship (4): 2019, 2020, 2021, 2022
National Hurling League (2): 2019, 2020
 All-Ireland Under-21 Hurling Championship (2): 2015, 2017
 Munster Under-21 Hurling Championship (2): 2015, 2017
 Munster Minor Hurling Championship (2): 2013, 2014

Awards
The Sunday Game Team of the Year (2): 2021, 2022
GAA GPA All Stars Awards: 2021, 2022

References

1996 births
Living people
South Liberties hurlers
Limerick inter-county hurlers
All Stars Awards winners (hurling)